Philautus disgregus is a species of frog in the family Rhacophoridae.
It is endemic to Malaysia.

Its natural habitat is subtropical or tropical moist lowland forests.
It is threatened by habitat loss.

References

Amphibians of Malaysia
Endemic fauna of Malaysia
disgregus
Amphibians described in 1989
Taxonomy articles created by Polbot